Canisp (Scottish Gaelic: Canasp) is a mountain in the far north west of Scotland. The mountain's name translates from the Old Norse language as “White Mountain”.

Geography and geology 
Canisp is an isolated mountain that stands in the Glencanisp Forest, a large rock and water wilderness. Canisp has little vegetation, even on its lower slopes large areas of Gneiss (one of the oldest rocks in the world) are visible on the surface.

Canisp stands in a geologically important area. It is part of the Moine Thrust Belt and is typical of many of the Assynt hills in that it rises from a base of Lewisian Gneiss and is composed of Torridonian sandstone capped by Cambrian quartzite giving the hill a distinctive light grey crown. Canisp was formed when surrounding rocks were eroded during an episode of glaciation, while the ridge was left poking above the level of the ice sheet, as a nunatak. Compared to the other Assynt hills, Canisp does not show any distinct topographic qualities. It has a symmetrical profile with two main ridges running northwest and southeast. Its southwestern flank has crags and scree and falls steeply into Glen Canisp, while its northeastern slopes also fall precipitously to the lochan studded moorland.

Canisp is less visited than the nearby smaller mountain of Suilven, with its famous jagged summit ridge, which stands  to the west and is  lower in elevation.

Canisp stands on the lands of the Glencanisp and Drumrunie Estates, a  tract of land original owned by the Vestey family. In 2005, the Assynt Foundation, a group of around 900 local residents, purchased the estate for £2,900,000.

Ascents 

The most popular ascent of Canisp starts at the north end of Loch Awe where there is car parking and a footbridge to cross the River Loanan as it leaves the loch. The route gains the summit by the south east ridge. Another ascent from the east which also uses the southeast ridge starts at Stronchrubie where there is also a footbridge over the Loanan. Longer ascents are also possible from Lochinver and Ledmore Junction, both these routes utilise the path between the two places that traverses the length of Glen Canisp before leaving the glen to climb the mountain by either its northwest ridge (from Lochinver) or southeast ridge (from Ledmore). The route from Lochinver gains the northwest ridge by a path from Loch na Gainimh and is regarded by Hamish Brown as the most pleasing way up the mountain. The summit of Canisp is marked by a large stone built wind shelter. The view from the top of the mountain is regarded as one of the finest in Scotland giving all round views taking in the surrounding loch studded moorland, The Minch beyond Lochinver and most of the well known mountains of Assynt.

See also 
 Stac Pollaidh
 Suilven

References 

 The Corbetts and Other Scottish Hill, (SMC Guide) 
 Climbing the Corbetts, Hamish Brown,

External links 
 BBC News on purchase of Glen Canisp Estate
 Geology of NW Scotland

Corbetts
Marilyns of Scotland
Mountains and hills of the Northwest Highlands